Aerotaxi was a state-owned Cuban charter airline. It operated basic services within Cuba, as well as some Caribbean charters.

History

Aerotaxi was founded in 1995 and went out of business in 2009.

Fleet

Aerotaxi's fleets consisted of:

Douglas DC-3 
Let L-410 Turbolet 
Antonov An-2 
Cessna Skymaster

Destinations
 Cienfuegos
 Havana
 Sancti Spiritus
 Santa Clara
 Trinidad

Services

Aerotaxi operated flights to popular tourist destinations, including Cayo Largo, Cayo Coco, Varadero, Trinidad, Cienfuegos, Nueva Gerona, Santiago de Cuba, Guardalavaca and Siguanea.

Accidents and incidents

On 14 March 2002 an Aerotaxi Antonov An-2 with two crew and 14 passengers crashed, with all on board killed.  The aircraft was on its way from Cienfuegos Jaime González Airport (CFG) to Cayo Coco Airport (CCC). While flying at an altitude of 3000 feet the top left wing snapped off. The aircraft entered a spin and crashed.
On 6 December 2002 an Aerotaxi Embraer EMB 110 Bandeirante on a flight from Holguín - Frank País Airport (HOG) to Havana - José Martí International Airport (HAV) crash-landed short of the runway while approaching in heavy rain. All 10 occupants on board survived.
On 19 March 2003 Aerotaxi Flight 887, a Douglas DC-3, en route from Nueva Gerona - Rafael Cabrera Airport (GER) to Havana - José Martí International Airport (HAV) was hijacked by six men using kitchen knives, tape and the airplane's own emergency hatchet. They demanded to be flown north to Miami. Florida Air National Guard F-15 Eagle fighter jets from Homestead Air Reserve Base and a UH-60 Black Hawk helicopter from the United States Customs Service escorted the Douglas DC-3 to Key West, Florida where it landed at 20:06. There were three crew members and 26 passengers on board; no one was injured.

See also 
 List of airlines of Cuba

References

External links
Aeronaves para taxi aéreo
Aviation-Safety Net
Caribbean Aviation

Defunct airlines of Cuba
Airlines established in 1995
Airlines disestablished in 2009
1995 establishments in Cuba
2009 disestablishments in Cuba
Government-owned airlines